Utkal Prantiya Marwari Yuva Manch (
Oriya:
ଉତ୍କଳ ପ୍ରାନ୍ତୀୟ ମାରବାଡି ଯୁବା ମଞ୍ଚ) is a state wing of national-level organization Marwari Yuva Manch It is one of the largest volunteer organizations in Odisha, having 5000 members and 125 branches in different cities and villages. The membership of Marwari Yuva Manch is limited to only Marwari community, but the service provided by this organization provides to people without any bias in religion or community or any other basics. The main aim of the MANCH is to organize the youth force and prepare them to contribute to the progress of the community as well as of the Nation.

All Cauntery yuva manch
There are 24 ambulances and dead body van, 138 Amrit Dhara (Cold Water Project), 361 oxygen cylinders are available across Odisha. Approximately 20,000 limbs have been distributed with the goal of disabled free Odisha. 1483 polio surgeries have been conducted. Every year blood donation approximately 4000.

 Ambulances Services
 Artificial Limb Camp
 Blood Donation Service
 Oxygen Service
 AmritDhara
 Mobile Cancer Detection Van

Leadership
The leadership is vested in the hands of the president elected by the members of electoral college which consists of branch president, secretary and state committee members, but most of the decisions taken by the executive body formulated by the elected president which consist of general members of Marwari Yuva Manch of different branches of the state. The serving president is Yuva Madhusudan Sharma, who succeeded Yuva Ramesh Agrawal in 2015 .The election of the president is conducted in every 2–3 years.

Incumbency Of President

References

External links 
 AIMYM website
 Official website of UPMYM
 Odisha Tourism
 Dharamgarh[utkal] website
 UPMYM FB Page
 UPMYM Facebook Group
 UPMYM Twitter Page
 Bangomunda(Utkal)facebook Page

Youth organisations based in India
Organizations established in 1988
Health charities in India
Organisations based in Odisha
Marwari people
1988 establishments in Orissa